The following is a list of all IFT-licensed over-the-air television stations broadcasting in the Mexican state of Quintana Roo. There are 22 television stations in Quintana Roo.

List of television stations

|-

|-

|-

|-

|-

|-

|-

|-

|-

|-

|-

|-

|-

|-

|-

|-

|-

|-

|-

|-

|-

References

Television stations in Quintana Roo
Quintana Roo